Pravčice is a municipality and village in Kroměříž District in the Zlín Region of the Czech Republic. It has about 700 inhabitants.

References

External links

Villages in Kroměříž District